Ivan Alekseevich Dwigubski (1771–1839) was a Russian naturalist, professor and rector of the Imperial University of Moscow.

Biography
Student of the medical faculty of the Imperial Moscow University (1793—1796). Elected professor of the Imperial University of Moscow (1804). Rector of the Imperial Moscow University (1826-1833).

Dwigubski lectured in Russian and called on Russian scientists to write scientific works in Russian: 
«Until the Russian language is respected by the Russians themselves, it is difficult to produce anything good until then. When they write for Russians, they teach their sciences not in Russian, where can one get a knowledge of the native language and attachment to it? In a whole Europe, maybe one Russia is not proud of its language ...»

Dwigubski published in 1828 the first description of the flora of the Moscow region - "Moscow flora, or a description of wild plants growing in the Moscow province", which included 924 species, as well as a short guide to wild plants in the vicinity of Moscow ("An easy way to recognize wild plants in the fields of Moscow”, first edition 1827, second edition 1838). He also wrote one of the first Russian physics textbooks (first edition 1808, third edition in two parts 1824-1825).

References

1771 births
1840 deaths
Imperial Moscow University alumni
Professorships at the Imperial Moscow University
People from Korochansky District
Recipients of the Order of St. Vladimir, 4th class
Recipients of the Order of St. Anna, 2nd class
19th-century botanists from the Russian Empire
19th-century zoologists from the Russian Empire
Rectors of Moscow State University